Thom Mark Gicquel (born 12 January 1999) is a French badminton player. Born in Tours, he started playing badminton at aged six in his parents club. Gicquel made his debut in the international senior tournament at the 2015 Riga International in Latvia, finished as the men's doubles runner-up partnered with Thomas Baures. He was part of the national junior team that won the bronze medal at the 2015 European Junior Championships, and made it to the gold medal in 2017. He also won the gold medal in the boys' doubles event with Toma Junior Popov. At the 2018 European Men's Team Championships, he helped the team claim the bronze medal. Teamed-up with Bastian Kersaudy, they clinched the men's doubles gold at the 2018 Mediterranean Games. He captured a bronze medal at the 2019 European Games in the mixed doubles event with Delphine Delrue. Gicquel and Delrue reached a career high as world number 10 in the BWF World ranking in 9 March 2021. He competed at the 2020 Summer Olympics.

Achievements

European Games 
Mixed doubles

European Championships 
Mixed doubles

Mediterranean Games 
Men's doubles

European Junior Championships 
Boys' doubles

BWF World Tour (2 titles, 4 runners-up) 
The BWF World Tour, which was announced on 19 March 2017 and implemented in 2018, is a series of elite badminton tournaments sanctioned by the Badminton World Federation (BWF). The BWF World Tour is divided into levels of World Tour Finals, Super 1000, Super 750, Super 500, Super 300 (part of the HSBC World Tour), and the BWF Tour Super 100.

Mixed doubles

BWF International Challenge/Series (5 titles, 5 runners-up) 
Men's doubles

Mixed doubles

  BWF International Challenge tournament
  BWF International Series tournament
  BWF Future Series tournament

References

External links 
 

1999 births
Living people
Sportspeople from Tours, France
French male badminton players
Badminton players at the 2020 Summer Olympics
Olympic badminton players of France
Mediterranean Games gold medalists for France
Competitors at the 2018 Mediterranean Games
Mediterranean Games medalists in badminton
Badminton players at the 2019 European Games
European Games bronze medalists for France
European Games medalists in badminton
21st-century French people